Theodorus was a "meridarch" (Civil Governor of a province) in the Swat province of the Indo-Greek kingdom in the northern Indian subcontinent, probably sometime between 100 BCE and the end of Greek rule in Gandhara in 55 BCE.

He is only known from a dedication written in kharoshthi on a relic vase inserted in a stupa in the Swat area of Gandhara, dated to the 1st century BCE (line-for-line translation):

Description
"Theudorena meridarkhenapratithavidaime sariraSakamunisa bhagavato
bahu-jana-stitiye"

"The meridarch Theodorus
has enshrined
these relics
of Lord Shakyamuni,
for the welfare of the mass of the people"

(Swāt relic vase inscription of the Meridarkh Theodoros )

This inscription represents one of the first known mention of the Buddha as a deity, using the Indian bhakti word Bhagavat ("Lord", "All-embracing personal deity"), suggesting the emergence of Mahayana doctrines in Buddhism.

It is also one of the examples of direct involvement of the Greeks with the Buddhist religion in India.

Theodorus is considered as contemporary or slightly posterior to another Indo-Greek named Heliodorus, whose c.100 BCE inscriptions have been preserved in the Heliodorus pillar.

References

Sources
 Monnaies Gréco-Bactriennes et Indo-Grecques, Catalogue Raisonné, Osmund Bopearachchi, 1991, Bibliothèque Nationale de France, .
 The Shape of Ancient Thought. Comparative studies in Greek and Indian Philosophies by Thomas McEvilley (Allworth Press and the School of Visual Arts, 2002) 
 Buddhism in Central Asia by B.N. Puri (Motilal Banarsidass Pub, January 1, 2000) 
 The Greeks in Bactria and India, W.W. Tarn, Cambridge University Press.
 Stefan Baums. 2012. “Catalog and Revised Texts and Translations of Gandharan Reliquary Inscriptions.” In: David Jongeward, Elizabeth Errington, Richard Salomon and Stefan Baums, Gandharan Buddhist Reliquaries, p. 204, Seattle: Early Buddhist Manuscripts Project (Gandharan Studies, Volume 1).
 Stefan Baums and Andrew Glass. 2002– . Catalog of Gāndhārī Texts, no. CKI 32

Greco-Buddhism